DE-CIX Palermo, is a carrier and data center-neutral internet exchange point (IX or IXP) in Palermo, Italy, founded in 2015 by DE-CIX.

The exchange is located in the carrier-neutral "Sicily Hub", TI Sparkle's (Telecom Italia) data center in Palermo.

See also 
 List of Internet exchange points
 Deutscher Commercial Internet Exchange

References 

Internet exchange points in Italy
Telecommunications in Italy
Internet in Italy